Lviv Cycling Team is a professional cycling team which competes in elite road bicycle racing events such as the UCI Women's World Tour. The team was established in 2019, registering with the UCI for the 2019 season.

Team roster

Major results
2019
Grand Prix Velo Alanya, Olena Sharha
VR Women ITT, Valeriya Kononenko

2022
Grand Prix Velo Alanya, Viktoriia Yaroshenko

National Champions
2019
 Ukraine Time Trial, Valeriya Kononenko

References

External links

UCI Women's Teams
Cycling teams established in 2019
Cycling teams based in Ukraine
2019 establishments in Ukraine
Sport in Lviv